Mimi Nelson (25 October 1922 – 3 July 1999) was a Swedish film actress. She appeared in Ingmar Bergman's films Port of Call (1948) and Thirst (1949).

Selected filmography

 Life and Death (1943)
 The Sixth Shot (1943)
 I Killed (1943)
 Live Dangerously (1944)
 Incorrigible (1946)
 Youth in Danger (1946)
 Maria (1947)
 The Night Watchman's Wife (1947)
 Loffe the Tramp (1948)
 Number 17 (1949)
 Woman in White (1949)
 Restaurant Intim (1950)
 Say It with Flowers (1952)
 Hidden in the Fog (1953)
 When the Mills are Running (1956)
 When Darkness Falls (1960)

References

External links

1922 births
1999 deaths
20th-century Swedish actresses
People from Växjö Municipality